The 2015 women's road cycling season was the first for the  Astana–Acca Due O cycling team, which began in 2015.

Team Roster

As of 10 March 2015. Ages as of 1 January 2015. 

Riders who left the team during or after the 2015 season

UCI World Ranking

The 2015 UCI Women's Road Rankings are rankings based upon the results in all UCI-sanctioned races of the 2015 women's road cycling season.

Astana-Acca Due O finished 28th in the 2015 ranking for UCI teams.

Footnotes

References

External links
 

2015 UCI Women's Teams seasons